Kineta is a village in north-eastern Ivory Coast. It is in the sub-prefecture of Ondéfidouo, Bouna Department, Bounkani Region, Zanzan District. Kineta is near the border with Ghana.

Kineta is at an altitude of 310 metres (1020 feet). The population within  of Kineta is approximately 596.

References

Populated places in Zanzan District
Populated places in Bounkani